Levi Malungu (born 12 June 2002) is a Belgian professional footballer who plays as a defender for Charleroi.

Club career
Malungu made his professional debut with Charleroi in a 3–1 Belgian First Division A win over Kortrijk on 30 January 2021.

On 31 January 2022, Malungu joined MVV in the Netherlands on loan until the end of the 2021–22 season.

References

External links
 
 ACFF Profile

2002 births
Living people
Belgian footballers
Belgium youth international footballers
Belgian people of Democratic Republic of the Congo descent
R. Charleroi S.C. players
MVV Maastricht players
Belgian Pro League players
Eerste Divisie players
Association football defenders
Black Belgian sportspeople
Belgian expatriate footballers
Expatriate footballers in the Netherlands
Belgian expatriate sportspeople in the Netherlands